Edmund Gerald FitzGibbon  (1 November 1825 – 12 December 1905) was a barrister and Town clerk of Melbourne.

FitzGibbon was born in Cork, Ireland, son of Gibbon Carew FitzGibbon and his wife Catherine, née Hurley.

FitzGibbon worked as a clerk in London and migrated to Victoria in 1852. In 1854 FitzGibbon became a clerical assistant in the Melbourne City Council office. Two years later FitzGibbon became town clerk of Melbourne, a position he held until 1891.

In 1882, the Victorian government botanist, Ferdinand von Mueller, named Lasiopetalum fitzgibbonii in his honour.

In 1891 FitzGibbon became full-time chairman of the Melbourne and Metropolitan Board of Works. FitzGibbon was appointed C.M.G. in 1892.

References

Melbourne City Council

External links

1825 births
1905 deaths
Australian barristers
Australian Companions of the Order of St Michael and St George
Australian people of Irish descent
19th-century Australian public servants